This is a list of American television-related events in 1974.

Events

Other notable events
On the CBS soap opera Love of Life, Meg Dale (Tudi Wiggins) calls her son Ben (Christopher Reeve) a "bastard", marking the first time that a swear word is spoken on American daytime television.

Television stations

Sign-ons

Network affiliation changes

Station closures

Television shows

Debuting this year

Ending this year
January 11
Love, American Style (1969–74) 
Room 222 (1969-1974) 
February 8 - The Secret Storm (1954–74) 
March 8 -- The Brady Bunch (1969–74) 
March 11 - The New Dick Van Dyke Show (1971–74) 
Mach 5 - Lotsa Luck (1973–74) 
March 18 - Here's Lucy (1968–74) 
March 23 - The Partridge Family (1970–74) 
March 24 - The Dean Martin Show (1965–74) 
May 29 - The Sonny & Cher Comedy Hour (1971–74) 
June 27 - The Flip Wilson Show (1970–74) 
September 8 - The F.B.I. (1965–74) 
October 4 - The Texas Wheelers (1974) 
October 12 - Star Trek: The Animated Series (1973–74) 
October 19 - The New Land (1974) 
December 20 - The Newlywed Game (1966–74)
December 28 - Nakia (1974)

Births

Deaths

See also
1974 in television 
1974 in film 
1974 in the United States 
List of American films of 1974

References

External links
List of 1974 American television series at IMDb